Bowling railway station is a closed station in the city of Bradford, West Yorkshire, England. It was on the line connecting the Bradford Exchange - Low Moor line of the Lancashire and Yorkshire Railway with the line of the Great Northern Railway (GNR) at Laisterdyke. It was opened by the GNR on 1 August 1854 and closed to passengers on 1 February 1895. The line remained open to freight until 4 May 1964. No trace remains of the station which was located northeast of the bridge crossing Wakefield Road.

References

Literature

Disused railway stations in Bradford
Former Great Northern Railway stations
Railway stations in Great Britain opened in 1854
Railway stations in Great Britain closed in 1895
1854 establishments in England